John Yen is Professor of Data Science and Professor-in-Charge of Data Science in the College of Information Sciences and Technology at Pennsylvania State University. He currently leads the Laboratory of AI for Cyber Security at Penn State. He was the founder and a former Director of the Cancer Informatics Initiative there.

Yen's current research goals are (1) using AI and big data to address challenges in cybersecurity, facilitated by scalable analytics and machine/deep learning, and developing theories and methods to model,
simulate, and predict the behaviors and impacts of cyber attacks using distributed machine learning in cloud,
(2) advance the frontier of Artificial intelligence by solving grand challenges in cybersecurity.

Yen has been a Principal investigator or co-Principal investigator of several multimillion-dollar research projects.  Sponsors of his research projects include National Science Foundation, Army Research Office, Office of Naval Research, and Department of Energy. He is the lead inventor of a novel Artificial Intelligence architecture R-CAST, which empowers AI (agents) with a computational representation of a shared mental model, inspired by Recognition primed decision, for supporting decision making of a human-AI team with advanced AI capabilities such as anticipating information needs of 
teammates (human or AI) based on the current decision making context, and proactively offering relevant information to 
the teammate who needs it.  This AI technology, developed with research funding from Army Research Lab, has been granted
a U.S. patent and successfully applied to a real-world dynamic cyber-physical domain.

Yen received his Ph.D. in computer science from the University of California, Berkeley in 1986. His thesis advisor is Prof. Lotfi A. Zadeh, the father of fuzzy logic.  Between 1986 and 1989, he was the main architect at USC Information Sciences Institute (ISI) for an AI architecture that pioneers a knowledge-level integration of a descriptive logic knowledge representation scheme with production rules. Before joining IST in 2001, he was a Professor of Computer Science and the Director of Center for Fuzzy Logic, Robotics, and Intelligent Systems at Texas A&M University. He was the Vice President of Publication for IEEE Neural Networks Council, now IEEE Computational Intelligence Society.  Yen received the National Science Foundation Young Investigator Award in 1992. He is an IEEE Fellow.

Yen received his B.S. degree in Electrical Engineering from National Taiwan University in 1980, and M.S. degree in Computer Science from University of Santa Clara in 1982.

Books 
Emergent Information Technologies and Enabling Policies for Counter-Terrorism, by Robert L. Popp, John Yen, 2006 (Amazon)
Fuzzy Logic: Intelligence, Control, and Information, by John Yen and Reza Langari, 1998 (Amazon)

See also
Recognition primed decision

References

External links
Dr. John Yen
Cancer Informatics Initiative, Penn State
Selected Publications
Intelligent Agents Laboratory at College of IST, PSU
Google Scholar Profile for John Yen

Living people
1958 births
People from Hsinchu
UC Berkeley College of Engineering alumni
American computer scientists
American people of Taiwanese descent
Santa Clara University alumni
Artificial intelligence researchers
Pennsylvania State University faculty